Janne Moilanen (born 24 June 1978) is a former football defender from Finland.

He is 186 cm tall and weighs 83 kg.

References
 Guardian Football
 This article is translated from the Finnish Wikipedia.

Living people
1978 births
Finnish footballers
FC Jokerit players
FC Lahti players
Kuopion Palloseura players
Veikkausliiga players
Finnish expatriate footballers
Expatriate footballers in Sweden
FC Trollhättan players
Kotkan Työväen Palloilijat players
Association football defenders
People from Mikkeli
Sportspeople from South Savo